Belfiore is a surname. Notable people with the surname include:

Ivan Belfiore (born 1960), Canadian soccer player
Joe Belfiore (born 1968), executive at Microsoft
Michael Belfiore, American author and journalist
Mike Belfiore (born 1988), American baseball pitcher